John Farragher OAM (born 1 April 1957) is an Australian former professional rugby league footballer who played in the 1970s.

Playing career
A Gilgandra junior, Farragher was graded by the Penrith Panthers in the 1977 season. Penrith coach Barry Harris gave Farragher his first grade debut in the 1978 season. He made his first grade debut in his side's 9−8 loss to the South Sydney Rabbitohs at Redfern Oval in round 4 of the 1978 season.

On 28 May 1978, in just his seventh appearance in the top grade, against the Newtown Jets at Henson Park in round 10 of the 1978 season, a collapsed scrum during the first half left him seriously injured. It was later revealed that he had dislocated his neck and damaged his spinal cord, and whilst surgery was able to correct the neck dislocation, he would become a quadriplegic.

Post playing
In the aftermath, a trust fund was set up to provide him with the financial support needed for the rest of his life. After extensive rehabilitation, Farragher returned to work at Panthers Leagues Club in 1982, taking on a role in public relations to greet and assist the club's members and guests. He still continues to hold that role, with his charm, warmth, and unwavering passion for the Panthers making him a most popular and recognizable character among the club's patrons. In 2016, he was awarded the Medal of the Order of Australia for his ongoing services to rugby league.

References

1957 births
Australian rugby league players
Living people
Penrith Panthers players
People with tetraplegia
Recipients of the Medal of the Order of Australia
Rugby league players from New South Wales
Rugby league props